The Diocese of Corniculana is a suppressed and titular see of the Roman Catholic Church.
 
The bishopric was centered on a Roman town, of the Roman province of Mauretania Caesariensis now lost to history but which flourished in late antiquity but did not last long after the Muslim conquest of the Maghreb. An exact location for that town is not known but Corniculana, was in what is today Algeria.

Nothing is known of the history of this diocese and of the city, except that among the Catholic bishops called to Carthage in 484 by the Vandal king Huneric was a bishop Syrus Corniculanensis, who was probably exiled as were most Catholic bishops of the day.

Today Corniculana survives as a titular bishopric and current bishop is Oscar Augusto Múnera Ochoa, apostolic vicar of Tierradentro.

See also
Mauretania Caesariensis

References

Roman towns and cities in Mauretania Caesariensis 
Catholic titular sees in Africa
Former Roman Catholic dioceses in Africa
Ancient Berber cities